

D02A Emollients and protectives

D02AA Silicone products

D02AB Zinc products

D02AC Soft paraffin and fat products

D02AD Liquid plasters

D02AE Carbamide products
D02AE01 Carbamide
D02AE51 Carbamide, combinations

D02AF Salicylic acid preparations

D02AX Other emollients and protectives

D02B Protectives against UV-radiation

D02BA Protectives against UV-radiation for topical use
D02BA01 Aminobenzoic acid
D02BA02 Octinoxate

D02BB Protectives against UV-radiation for systemic use
D02BB01 Betacarotene
D02BB02 Afamelanotide

References

D02